Tun Haji Abdul Razak bin Dato' Hussein (11 March 1922 – 14 January 1976) was a Malaysian lawyer and politician who served as the 2nd Prime Minister of Malaysia from September 1970 until his death in January 1976. He also served as the first deputy prime minister of Malaysia from August 1957 to September 1970. He is referred to as the Father of Development (Bapa Pembangunan).

Abdul Razak was the figure responsible for setting up Barisan Nasional (BN), which is the ruling coalition of political parties that held power in Malaysia. Abdul Razak is also renowned for launching the Malaysian New Economic Policy (MNEP).

His eldest son, Najib Razak, became the sixth prime minister in 2009; Najib is the first prime minister of Malaysia to be a descendant of a former prime minister.

Early life and education
Born in Kampung Pulau Keladi, a village located northwest of Pekan, Pahang on 11 March 1922, Abdul Razak is the first of two children to Yang DiHormat Orang Kaya Indera Shahbandar ke-9, Dato' Hussein bin Mohd Taib and Datin Hajah Teh Fatimah bt Daud. An aristocratic descendant of Orang Kaya Indera Shahbandar, Abdul Razak studied at the Malay College Kuala Kangsar.

After joining the Malay Administrative Service in 1939, he was awarded a scholarship to study at Raffles College in Singapore in 1940. His studies at the college ceased with the onset of the Second World War. During the war he helped organise the Wataniah resistance movement in Pahang.

After World War II, Abdul Razak left for Britain in 1947 to study law. In 1950 he received a law degree and qualified as a barrister at Lincoln's Inn in London. During his student days in England,  Abdul Razak was a member of the British Labour Party and a prominent student leader of the Malay Association of Great Britain. He also formed the Malayan Forum.

Involvements in World War II

Early WWII and Askar Wataniah 
After his studies were interrupted in 1942 because of World War II, Abdul Razak returned to Kuantan, Pahang. There, he met his former colleague from the Malay Administrative Service, Yeop Mahidin, and expressed his interest in joining the Malay Regiment (now Royal Malay Regiment). Mahidin, who is also the founder of Askar Wataniah Pahang ('Pahang State Territorial Army'; precursor of Rejimen Askar Wataniah), recruited Razak into his new guerrilla forces. After finishing his training under Mahidin, Razak was instructed by him to join the Japanese Malayan Civil Service as an agent and informant.

Informant in Japanese Administration 
After finishing his Japanese Military Training, Razak, as an aristocrat and son of a respected Malay leader in Pahang, was posted to his home-state Pahang as an assistant to District Officer and at the same time as a bridge for the Japanese to gain the trust of local Pahang Malays. Using his privileges as an aristocrat, Razak started networking with the Japanese Imperial Forces while maintaining his connection with Yeop Mahidin. His role as an informant inside the Japanese Administration was known only to a few of Wataniah members including Mahidin. Because of this, Razak was labelled as a traitor by the rest of the Wataniah Pahang.

Force 136 Pahang 
At first, the Malays were not fully trusted by the British to fight the Japanese because of a few incidents and better treatment by the Japanese Administration towards Malays compared to other races. After gaining sufficient trust, the Askar Wataniah Pahang with its 200 members was absorbed into the Special Operations Executive (SOE) and made into to Force 136 Pahang.

Force 136 Pahang's missions' continuous success made the Japanese Administration begin to suspect that there were informants inside their administration. Force 136 Pahang quickly set up an extraction mission to recover their agent, Razak, who was still unknown to many of its members.

After he had been successfully extracted, Razak continued his work with Force 136 and was promoted to the rank of captain. Among notable missions, Razak was involved in the rescue of Sultan Abu Bakar of Pahang from MPAJA.

Political involvement

Upon his return from the United Kingdom, in 1950, Tun Razak joined the Malayan Civil Service. Owing to his political calibre, he became the youth chief for United Malays National Organisation (UMNO). Two years later, he worked as the Assistant State Secretary of Pahang and in February 1955, at just 33 years of age, became Pahang's Chief Minister.

Razak stood in and won a seat in Malaya's first general elections in July 1955 and was appointed as the Education Minister. He was instrumental in the drafting of the Razak Report which formed the basis of the Malayan education system. Tun Razak was also a key member of the February 1956 mission to London to seek the independence of Malaya from the British.

After the general elections in 1959, he became the Minister of Rural Development in addition to holding the portfolios of Deputy Prime Minister and Minister of Defence, which he held from 1957. His achievements include formulating the development policy known as the Red Book.

Infusing young blood
At the time of Separation of Singapore from the Federation of Malaysia in 1965, Tun Razak realised that UMNO needed more young leaders in the party. Faced with, amongst other things Lee Kuan Yew's considerable rhetorical skills, Razak wanted young Malay leaders – grounded in their own faith and culture – who would be able to speak and if necessary debate both in the Malay language and English language.

Razak understood that power resided in the Malay community and that for this power to be wielded effectively, the elite among the Malays had to be an elite determined by ability, aptitude and commitment to the nation as a whole. Class, birth and money were secondary in his calculations.

As a consequence of this initiative, the then young leaders of mixed heritage in UMNO, such as Mahathir Mohamad, were drafted into higher echelons of the political establishment.

In 1967 he was awarded the Ramon Magsaysay Award for community leadership.

Prime Ministership
After the 13 May Incident in 1969, Tunku Abdul Rahman Putra received many criticisms from various parties for his inability to deal with racial issues. This led to his resignation as prime minister. Tun Abdul Razak then imposed a State of Emergency, ruling by decree as the National Operations Council until 1970. In September 1970, Tunku Abdul Rahman was succeeded by Tun Abdul Razak as the Prime Minister of Malaysia.

Tun Razak set up the Barisan Nasional or National Front on 1 January 1973 to replace the ruling Alliance Party. He increased the membership of its parties and coalitions in an effort to establish "Ketahanan Nasional" (National Strength) through political stability.

Tun Razak is also renowned for launching the Malaysian New Economic Policy (MNEP) in 1971. He and the "second generation" of Malay politicians saw the need to tackle vigorously the economic and social disparities which fuelled racial antagonisms and violence. The MNEP set two basics goals – to reduce and eventually eradicate poverty, and to reduce and eventually eradicate identification of economic function with race.

Death
Abdul Razak was diagnosed with leukemia but kept it secret since 1969.

Abdul Razak died in office on 14 January 1976 while seeking medical treatment in London. He was posthumously granted the soubriquet Bapa Pembangunan ('Father of Development'). He was laid to rest in Heroes Mausoleum near Masjid Negara, Kuala Lumpur.

Awards and recognitions

Honours of Malaysia
 :
  Grand Commander of the Order of the Defender of the Realm (SMN) – Tun (1959)
  :
 Recipient of the Malaysian Commemorative Medal (Gold) (PPM) (1965)
 Recipient of the Order of the Crown of the Realm (DMN) (1976)
 Tun Abdul Razak was posthumously granted the sobriquet Bapa Pembangunan ('Father of Development').
  :
  Grand Knight of the Order of the Crown of Pahang (SIMP) – formerly Dato', now Dato' Indera (1967)
  Member 1st class of the Family Order of the Crown of Indra of Pahang (DK I) (1973)
  :
  Knight Grand Commander of the Order of the Crown of Kelantan or Al-Muhammad Star (SPMK) – Dato'
  Recipient of the Royal Family Order or Star of Yunus (DK)
  : 
  Member of the Kedah Supreme Order of Merit (DUK) 
  :
  Knight Grand Commander of the Order of the Defender of State (DUPN) – Dato' Seri Utama (1975)
  :
  Grand Commander of the Order of Kinabalu (SPDK) – Datuk Seri Panglima
  : 
  Knight Grand Commander of the Order of the Crown of Perlis (SPMP) – Dato' Seri (1965)
  : 
  Knight Grand Commander of the Order of the Crown of Selangor (SPMS) – Dato' Seri (1965)
  :
  Knight Grand Commander of the Order of the Crown of Johor (SPMJ) – Dato' (1961)
  :
  Knight Grand Commander of the Order of the Crown of Terengganu (SPMT) – Dato' (1964)
  :
  Knight Grand Commander of the Order of the Perak State Crown (SPMP) – Dato' Seri (1964)
  Grand Knight of the Order of Cura Si Manja Kini (SPCM) – Dato' Seri (1974)
  :
  Knight Grand Commander of the Order of the Star of Hornbill Sarawak (DP) – Datuk Patinggi

Foreign honours
  :
  Second Class of the Order of Seri Paduka Mahkota Brunei (DPMB) – Dato Paduka (1958)
  First Class of the Order of Seri Paduka Mahkota Brunei (SPMB) – Dato Seri Paduka (1959)
  :
  Grand Collar of the Order of Lakandula (2017)
  :
   Associate Knight of the Order of the Hospital of St John of Jerusalem (KStJ) (1967)
  Honorary Knight Grand Cross of the Order of St Michael and St George (GCMG) (1972)

Things named after him

Several things were named after him, including:
 Tun Razak Highway (Federal Route 12 connecting Segamat, Johor to Gambang, Pahang)
 Jalan Tun Razak in Kuala Lumpur (part of Kuala Lumpur Middle Ring Road 1)
 Jalan Tun Abdul Razak in Johor Bahru (part of Skudai Highway)
 Jalan Tun Abdul Razak in Ipoh (also known as Maxwell Road)
 Jalan Tun Abdul Razak in Melaka City (street name for Melaka Bypass)
 Jalan Tun Razak in Kota Kinabalu
 Jalan Tun Abdul Razak in Gowa, Sulawesi Selatan, Indonesia (known as Jalan Hertasning Baru and Jalan Aroepala)
 Jalan Tun Razak in Putrajaya
 Taman Tun Abdul Razak also known as Taman TAR (a residential area in Ampang Jaya, Selangor)
 Desa Tun Razak, a small township in the outskirts of Kuala Lumpur 
 Bandar Tun Razak in Kuala Lumpur
  Bandar Tun Razak LRT station
 Parliamentary constituency of Bandar Tun Razak
 Bandar Tun Razak, Jengka in Pahang
 Bandar Tun Abdul Razak, Rompin, Pahang
 Komtar Tower in George Town, Penang
 Komtar JBCC in Johor Bahru, Johor
 Komtar Skywalk in George Town, Penang
 SK Tun Abdul Razak, a primary school in Kuala Kubu Bharu, Selangor
 Kampung Tun Abdul Razak, a township in Kuala Kubu Bharu
 Surau Desa Tun Abdul Razak, a prayer hall in Desa Tun Razak, Kuala Lumpur 
 Surau Rumah Keluarga Angkatan Tentera Tun Abdul Razak, a prayer hall for Malaysians veteran army in Desa Tun Razak, Kuala Lumpur 
 Institut Penyiaran dan Penerangan Tun Abdul Razak, a government broadcasting office in Taman Bukit Angkasa, Kuala Lumpur
 Dewan Terbuka Tun Abdul Razak, a community hall centre in Labu, Negeri Sembilan
 Jalan Tun Abdul Razak, a major road in Kangar, Perlis
 Masjid Tun Abdul Razak Repoh, a mosque in Kangar, Perlis
 Jalan Tun Abdul Razak, a major road in Johor Bahru, Johor 
 Jalan Tun Razak, a major road in Alor Setar, Kedah
 Kampung Tun Abdul Razak and Kampung Tun Rahah, a township in honour of Tun Razak and her spouse, Tun Rahah in Bukit Katil, Melaka
 Auditorium Tun Abdul Razak in Balok, Pahang

 Rumah Kelahiran Tun Abdul Razak, a museum of his hometown house in Pekan, Pahang
 Chanselori Tun Abdul Razak, Universiti Malaysia Pahang
 Rumah Penyayang Tun Abdul Razak, a nursing home in Pekan, Pahang
 Sekolah Berasrama Penuh Integrasi, a fully integrated boarding school in Pekan, Pahang
 Jalan Tun Razak, a road in Kuala Kangsar, Perak
 Auditorium Tun Razak, Jalan Kolej Melayu, Kuala Kangsar 

 SMK Tun Abdul Razak, a secondary school in Selekoh, Perak
 Tun Abdul Razak National Secondary School, a secondary school in Kuching, Sarawak
 Tun Abdul Razak Stadium in Bandar Tun Razak, Jengka, Pahang
 Tun Razak Hockey Stadium in Kuala Lumpur
 SK Pusat Penyelidikan Pertanian Tun Razak, a primary school in Jerantut, Pahang
 SMK Pusat Penyelidikan Pertanian Tun Razak, a secondary school in Jerantut, Pahang
 Pusat Penyelidikan Pertanian Tun Razak, a scientific research base in Jerantut, Pahang
 Tun Abdul Razak Research Centre (formerly known as British Rubber Producers' Research Association) in Brickendonbury, England
 Tun Abdul Razak Chancellor Hall (DECTAR) at the National University of Malaysia (UKM) in Bangi, Selangor
 Tun Abdul Razak Library (PTAR) at MARA University of Technology (UiTM), Shah Alam, Selangor
 Tun Razak Library, a public library in Ipoh, Perak
 MRSM Tun Abdul Razak, MARA Junior Science College in Pekan, Pahang.
 Bandar Tun Razak, a township in Jengka, Pahang
 Stadium Tun Abdul Razak, a stadium in Jengka Pahang
 Sekolah Berasrama Penuh Integrasi Tun Abdul Razak (SBPITAR), an integrated boarding school in Pekan, Pahang
 Sekolah Dato' Abdul Razak (SDAR), all-boys boarding school in Seremban, Negeri Sembilan.
 Universiti Tun Abdul Razak (UNIRAZAK), a private university in Kuala Lumpur.
 Tun Abdul Razak Residential College, one of residential college in Universiti Malaysia Perlis
 Dewan Tun Abdul Razak, Menara Kembar Bank Rakyat in Kuala Lumpur
 Dewan Tun Abdul Razak, a museum exhibition gallery in Kuching, Sarawak Museum
 Dewan Tun Abdul Razak 1 & 2, Putra World Trade Centre, Kuala Lumpur
 Dewan Kenangan Tun Abdul Razak in Baling, Kedah
 Institut Teknologi Tun Abdul Razak in Petaling Jaya, Selangor
 Institut Teknologi Tun Abdul Razak in Perai, Penang
 Tun Abdul Razak Hockey Cup
 Tun Abdul Razak Heritage Park, a public recreational park in Kuala Lumpur
 Tun Abdul Razak Memorial, a memorial in Kuala Lumpur
 Kem Tun Razak, a military camp in Bayan Lepas, Penang
 Tun Razak Chair at Ohio University's Department of Southeast Asian Studies
 Tun Razak Exchange
  Tun Razak Exchange MRT station in Kuala Lumpur
 Tun Razak Tower in Kuala Lumpur
 Universiti Tun Abdul Razak, formerly known as SIDMA College, Kota Kinabalu, Sabah
 Perpustakaan Tun Abdul Razak, a public library of UiTM Kota Kinabalu Branch
 Kolej Tun Abdul Razak, a residential college at Universiti Malaysia Perlis, Arau, Perlis
Kolej Tun Abdul Razak and Kolej Toh Puan Abdul Razak, residential colleges at Universiti Teknologi MARA, Bukit Besi, Terengganu

 Kolej Tun Abdul Razak, a residential college at Universiti Teknologi MARA, Machang, Kelantan

 Kolej Tun Razak, a residential college at Universiti Teknologi Malaysia, Skudai, Johor

In popular culture
Motion picture & television
 Malaysian actor Zaefrul Nordin played Razak in 2007 film 1957: Hati Malaya
 FFM Award Winning actor Rusdi Ramli portrayed Razak in 2013 film Tanda Putera and won his second FFM for Best Leading Actor. 
 Malaysian actor Abdul Manan Sulaiman in 2015 film, Kapsul 
Stage/Theatre
 FFM nominee Rashidi Ishak portrayed Razak in 2009 local theatre production Tun Razak in Istana Budaya.

References

External links

 Tun Razak’s legacy – his vision, The Star, 2 March 2008.
 The band of brothers C. S. TAN, The Star, 2 March 2008.

Government ministers of Malaysia
Prime Ministers of Malaysia
1922 births
1976 deaths
Deaths from leukemia
Deputy Prime Ministers of Malaysia
Foreign ministers of Malaysia
Malayan people of World War II
Malaysian political party founders
Presidents of United Malays National Organisation
Malaysian people of Bugis descent
Malaysian people of Malay descent
Malaysian Muslims
People from Pahang
Raffles Institution alumni
Members of the Dewan Rakyat
Honorary Knights Grand Cross of the Order of St Michael and St George
Grand Commanders of the Order of the Defender of the Realm
Knights Grand Commander of the Order of the Crown of Johor
Knights Grand Commander of the Order of the Crown of Terengganu
Knights Grand Commander of the Order of the Star of Hornbill Sarawak
Grand Commanders of the Order of Kinabalu
20th-century Malaysian politicians
Defence ministers of Malaysia
Education ministers of Malaysia
Home ministers of Malaysia
20th-century Malaysian lawyers
Members of Lincoln's Inn
Knights Grand Commander of the Order of the Crown of Selangor
Recipients of the Order of the Crown of the Realm
Recipients of the Kedah Supreme Order of Merit
First Classes of the Family Order of the Crown of Indra of Pahang
Grand Collars of the Order of Lakandula